Rough Guides Ltd is a British travel guide book and reference publisher, which has been owned by APA Publications since November 2017. In addition to publishing guidebooks, the company also provides a tailor-made trips service based on customers’ individual criteria.

The Rough Guides travel titles cover more than 200 destinations beginning with the 1982 Rough Guide to Greece, a book conceived by Mark Ellingham, who was dissatisfied with the polarisation of existing guidebooks between cost-obsessed student guides and "heavyweight cultural tomes".

Initially aimed at low-budget backpackers, the guidebooks have incorporated more expensive recommendations since the early 1990s, and are now marketed to travellers on all budgets. Since the late 1990s the books have contained colour printing. Much of the books' travel content is also available online.

Penguin became responsible for sales and distribution in 1992, acquiring a majority stake in 1996 and buying Rough Guides outright in 2002.

In November 2007, after the company had celebrated "25 Rough Years" with a celebratory series of books, Ellingham left Rough Guides to set up a new green and ethical imprint, GreenProfile, at Profile Books. Rough Guides was run from 2003 until later in the decade by co-founder Martin Dunford and Andrew Lockett, under the aegis of Penguin before their merger with Random House. 

In 2017, Rough Guides was sold to APA Publications, parent of Insight Guides. It is now based at APA's offices in Mill Street, Bermondsey, southeast London.

The slogan of Rough Guides is "Make the Most of Your Time on Earth".

Books 

Most of the series' early titles were written or edited by John Fisher, Jack Holland and Martin Dunford, who along with Mark Ellingham were co-founders and owners of Rough Guides. In 1995, they negotiated the sale of the series to Penguin Books, a process which was completed in 2002.

In 1994, the first non-travel Rough Guides books were published: The Rough Guide to World Music and The Rough Guide to Classical Music. The success of these titles encouraged expansion of the Rough Guides format into other areas of publishing to cover a range of reference subjects, including music – covering genres such as world music, rock, hip-hop, jazz, and individual artists – and topics such as film, literature, popular science, ethical living, true crime, Shakespeare, pregnancy and birth, plus the Internet and related subjects such as eBay, blogging and iPods.

Trips 
In November 2018, Rough Guides launched its tailormade trips service. The service offers individualized travel experiences chosen by the traveller, planned by a local expert, and booked by Rough Guides. In keeping with the brand ethos, the trips generally include some sort of adventurous component, dependent on what the traveller has asked for.

Digital publishing
Rough Guides migrated to digital platforms with the launch of Rough Guides city guides for iOS, Android and Windows platforms, interactive e-books, and downloadable guide chapters. In January 2013 Rough Guides launched a new website. From 1 April 2019, Rough Guides started rolling out a scheme to offer a free downloadable e-book with every print guide purchased.

Podcasts
Rough Guides runs a podcast called The Rough Guide to Everywhere, which was launched in 2017. The podcast explores topical travel issues and interviews inspirational travel personalities who have unique stories to tell.

The first episode went live on 30 January 2017 with the first two series being hosted by Greg Dickinson. On 3 May 2019, Rough Guides announced series 3 and introduced the new hosts, Rebecca Hallett and Neil McQuillian. The first episode of series 4 went live in May 2019 and is hosted by Aimee White. 

On 9 April 2019, it was announced that The Rough Guide to Everywhere had been nominated for the Best Branded Podcast category at The British Podcast Awards.

Music 

In association with UK-based record label World Music Network, Rough Guides has issued over 350 recorded anthologies of the music of various nations and regions. In addition to their "Rough Guide" Series, the record label World Music Network has released 130 recordings in their other "Introducing", "Riverboat", and "Think Global" Series.

Television 

In the late 1980s, the Rough Guides brand was spun off into a series of travel shows on United Kingdom television channel BBC 2. Initially part of Janet Street Porter's DEF II strand, alongside Rapido and Jovanotti's Gimme 5, the show became established in BBC 2's early 1990s evening schedule.

Later editions of the show, usually hosted by Sigue Sigue Sputnik associate Magenta Devine (with various male co-presenters through the show's run), were repeated on the Sky Travel channel until 2005.

A new Rough Guide series of fifteen thirty-minute programmes started production in November 2007 and began airing on Channel 5 (the UK's fifth terrestrial channel), on 7 January 2008. A second 'Rough Guide to…' series was aired starting in November 2008.

Environmental campaigns

In May 2007, Mark Ellingham said he had grave concerns about the growth of air travel because of its growing contribution to climate change.
He launched a joint awareness campaign with Tony Wheeler (Lonely Planet founder), and Rough Guides began including a "health warning" in each of its travel guides, urging readers to "Fly less, stay longer" wherever possible.

References

External links

Travel guide books
Publishing companies of the United Kingdom
British travel websites
Publishing companies established in 1982
World music
1982 establishments in England
2002 mergers and acquisitions
2017 mergers and acquisitions